The Seattle-Tacoma Shipbuilding Corporation (also operating as Todd Pacific) was an American corporation which built escort carriers, destroyers, cargo ships and auxiliaries for the United States Navy and merchant marine during World War II  in two yards in Puget Sound, Washington. It was the largest producer of destroyers (45) on the West Coast and the largest producer of escort carriers of various classes (56) of any United States yard active during World War II.

History 
The Todd Corporation, just having established itself in New York, acquired the Seattle Construction and Drydock Company (a.k.a. The Moran Brothers Shipyard of Klondike Gold Rush fame) in Seattle Harbor during World War I some time in 1916. The yard was acquired in 1918 by Skinner & Eddy, which had quickly risen to become a major force in Northwest Pacific shipbuilding. Todd moved his Seattle operation to nearby Harbor Island where a repair facility was constructed. In 1917 the company also set foot in Tacoma, where the first work on facilities of an entirely new yard was underway in January 1917 and the first ship, the Tacoma, was launched on March 28, 1918.

In addition to the government contracts, the Tacoma yard built 2 cargo ships (named Red Hook and Hoboken after 2 of Todd's New York Harbor locations), 1 diesel freighter, 2 passenger ships and 6 barges. The Red Hook found its way into Imperial Japanese Army service as Naruo Maru and was sunk in 1944.

Shipbuilding ceased in the Seattle yard in 1920 and in the Tacoma yard in 1924. William H. Todd died May 15, 1932. John D. Reilly became  president of Todd Shipyards.

In 1939, the old Tacoma shipyard in Commencement Bay was revived (from scratch) by Todd and Kaiser Shipbuilding, initially with two slipways, with the aid of some $15 million in capital provided by the U.S. Government this was eventually increased to eight.

Following the enactment of the Two-Ocean Navy Act, Seattle-Tacoma was awarded contracts to build 25 destroyers. The government invested $9 million in a new destroyer construction facility on Harbor Island which was then built starting October 15, 1940 next to the existing repair dock founded in 1918.

In February 1942 Todd bought out Kaiser's holding and sold the companies own interests in Permanente Metals and some time thereafter Seattle-Tacoma was reabsorbed into Todd Dry Dock & Construction, which eventually became Todd Pacific Shipyards. Todd sold the Tacoma shipyard to the Navy after the war ended, which in turn sold the site to the Port of Tacoma in 1959. Today the site is set for redevelopment as part of the Port's Commencement Bay Industrial Development District.

Robert Moran, great-granduncle of the company, died in 1943.

The "Plant A" destroyer facility produced a single civilian ship, the luxury ferry Chinook, launched in 1947, but by 1952 oil terminals had been established in the spot.

The original repair yard continued to be part of the Todd Corporation, now building new civilian and military ships and it remains active to this day as a facility of Vigor Shipyards.

Ships built

Tacoma yard 

in Commencement Bay

Escort carriers (56)

 37 of 45 s (C3-S-A1)
 several were completed / fitted out at Willamette Iron and Steel Works, Portland, Oregon
 19 of 19 s
  ... 
 3 completed at Commercial Iron Works in Portland, Oregon (CVE-110, CVE-126, CVE-121)
 1 completed at Willamette Iron and Steel Works in Portland, Oregon (CVE-108)

Auxiliaries (14)

 2 of 2 s (C3-S1-A3)
 , 
 ordered October 23, 1940
 4 of 4 s (C3 Mod.)
  ... 
 5 of 23 s (T1-MT-M1)
  ... 
 3 of 6 s

Cargo (5)

  5 of 95 C1-B (5 of 10 diesel variant C1-B)
 ordered: 10 September 1939
 first keel laying on 5 March 1940
  (MC-119) launched August 1, 1940, delivered to American Mail Lines April 3, 1941
  (MC-120) launched September 28, 1940, delivered to American Mail lines May 29, 1941
 Cape Cleare (MC-121) launched November 29, 1940, renamed , delivered to Pacific-Atlantic Steamship Corporation, sunk 1941
  (MC-122) launched April 11, 1941
 Cape Douglas (MC-123) launched June 10, 1941, renamed  delivered to Pacific-Atlantic Steamship Corporation
 2 Hooven-Owens-Rentschler 6-cylinder diesel engines with magnetic coupling and single reduction gears (2.55:1)
 2 Washington Iron Works auxiliary diesels

Ships of World War II produced before 1924 (incomplete)

  – torpedoed November 1942 on Atlantic convoy duty (SC 107)
 Empire Wagtail – torpedoed December 1942 on Atlantic convoy duty (ON 154)
  – torpedoed September 1941 on Atlantic convoy duty (SC 42)
  – torpedoed off the coast of Virginia April 1942
  – sunk by aerial torpedo as part of an Italian convoy
 El Coston
 Empire Mallard
 Empire Tiger
 Empire Elk – survived
 Willimantic (built in Seattle)
 Empire Gazelle – survived

Description of the plant as of January 1940: 
Photograph of the plant in the initial 2-ways stage (launch of the Cape Alava):

Seattle yard 

on Harbor Island in 2 separate facilities at the north end of the island. In 1918 Todd moved out of the seattle waterfront and opened a repair facility on the northwestern corner. In 1940 additional slipways were added on the northeastern end. The expansion had all 5 building ways upon initial completion (2 destroyers each). In June 1945, 5 destroyers were building, the unfinished  was about to be laid down and 2 destroyer tenders ( and  - eventually aborted) were using up 1 full slipway each.

Although the Seattle yard produced the largest number of destroyers on the West Coast, Union Iron Works was slightly more productive overall with 4 s, 9 s, 18 Fletchers, 6 Sumners, 3 Gearings and 12 s.

Contracts awarded

 NOD1502 7/40 destroyers $29,406,000 (= 5 Gleaves)
 NOD1511 9/40 destroyers $109,726,000 (= 15 Fletcher)
 NOD1502S 12/40 destroyers $29,406,000 (= 5 Gleaves)
 NOD1760 3/41 gasoline tankers aog $10,700,000 (= 5 Patapsco, built in Tacoma)
 OBS315 8/42 destroyers $40,799,000 (= 6 Fletcher)
 OBS329 8/42 destroyers $107,535,000 (= 15 Sumner)
 OBS10215 8/44 ship repairs $2,081,000
 total: $329,653,000

45 of 415 destroyers

 10 of 66 
 (May 1, 1941 - September 7, 1942)
  ... 
  ... 
 21 of 175 
 (March 8, 1942 - June 6, 1944)
  ... 
  ... 
 5 of 58  (as Todd Pacific according to some sources)
  ... 
 9 of 98  (as Todd Pacific according to some sources)
  ... 
 1 additional, was launched incomplete and never commissioned

1 of 6 s

 
  - canceled incomplete

For the first 30 ships the allocation based on keel laid and launch dates can only be

 Slip A: , 
 Slip B: , 
 Slip C: , 
 Slip D: , 
 Slip E: , 
 Slip F: , 
 Slip G: , 
 Slip H: , 
 Slip I: , 
 Slip J: , 

None of the 10 Gearings could have occupied the slip where Isle Royale was built.

None of the 5 Sumners or Rooks could have been built at G, H, I, J.

Rowan must have been built on G.

At least 2 Gearings must have been built following a Gearing and no 3 Gearings could have been built on the same slip.

Assuming a slip was not left unoccupied for 82 days only to build another destroyer, no more destroyers were built on H. The same is true for I (54 days gap) and J (40 days gap). Even then Gurke must have followed Rooks with a 25-day gap and the purely analytical approach can't account for that. Ship repairs may be responsible and could cause any length of gap.

What is certain is that destroyer production slowed down in 1944. In the Union Iron Works yard, no new keels were laid after April 1944 and slipways apparently went unused by September 1944.

Todd Dry Dock, Inc. 

TODO: this facility was very active in the interwar period, including some big conversion jobs.

WW2 conversions of ... (incomplete)

 , 
 see also Two-Ocean Navy Act#AUX ANV
 
 
 
 SS Cape Cleare to troop transport (1943) (a different Cape Cleare from the one launched in Tacoma in 1940)

TODO: this yard became one of two big cold war era shipyards in Seattle, the other being Lockheed.

Todd Dry Dock and Construction Company 

Of the 6 steel shipyards building for the Shipping Board in Puget Sound, Todd Construction was the only one not located in Elliott Bay. This yard was located in the same rectangular area on the Hylebos Waterway as the World War II era yard and it also had 8 slipways.

Description of the plant including a map: 

Historical trivia: Five ships (listed below) built in the yard where acquired from the USSB in the early 30s by Swayne & Hoyt and given Point names, In addition, Point Ancha (ex-Delight), Point Bonita (ex-Sacramento), which were built in Seattle. The Red Hook and Hoboken were never USSB property though. TODO: Show how this naming scheme started in Portland by Albina Engine & Machine Works, from where Swayne & Hoyt picked it up.

The Kennecott was somewhat unusual for its time and one of only 7 diesel motor ships of more than 1,000 tons built in the United States in 1921 and one of 82 built or newly converted worldwide.

Pacific Reserve Fleet, Tacoma 
After the war the United States Navy took over the Seattle-Tacoma Shipbuilding shipyard and for use as part of the United States Navy reserve fleets, also called a mothball fleet. The Pacific Reserve Fleet, Tacoma was used to store the now many surplus ships after World War II. Some ships in the Commencement Bay Reserve Fleet were reactivated for the Korean War. The Navy sold the shipyard to the Port of Tacoma in 1959. The ships stored at Pacific Reserve Fleet, Tacoma were either scrapped or moved to other reserve fleets.

 Example ships:
 USS Lunga Point was placed in the Pacific Reserve Fleet, Tacoma in 1946 and removed in June 1955 and recommissioned as CVU-94.
 USS Kwajalein was placed in the Pacific Reserve Fleet, Tacoma in 1946 and removed in June 1955 and recommissioned as CVU-98 a utility aircraft carrier.
 USS Tinian (CVE-123) a Commencement Bay-class escort carrier, was stored at Reserve Fleet, Tacoma, being completed in 1946, too late for World War II. On June 12, 1955, the ship was reclassified as an escort helicopter aircraft carrier and re-designated CVHE-123.

Shipbuilding in Puget Sound 

 Elliott Bay
 Seattle waterfront
 Skinner & Eddy No. 1 
 Moran Brothers Shipyard 
 Moran Company
 Seattle Construction and Drydock Company
 Skinner & Eddy No. 2
 Nielson & Kelez 
 West Seattle
 Seattle North Pacific Shipbuilding Corporation 
 Ames Shipbuilding and Drydock Company 
 Harbor Island
 Seattle-Tacoma Shipbuilding 
 Puget Sound Bridge and Dredging Company 
 Associated Shipbuilders
 Lockheed Shipbuilding and Construction Company
 J. F. Duthie & Company 
 Commencement Bay
 Todd Construction and Drydock Company 
 Seattle-Tacoma Shipbuilding
 Western Boat Building Co
 Tacoma Boatbuilding Company
 Bainbridge Island
 Winslow Marine Railway and Shipbuilding Company 
 Bremerton
 Puget Sound Naval Shipyard 
 Everett
 Everett-Pacific Shipbuilding & Dry Dock Company 
 Lake Union
 Lake Union Dry Dock Company 
 Lake Washington
 Lake Washington Shipyard

See also 
 Boeing Plant 2 – located a few miles upstream the Duwamish River
 
 List of Emergency Fleet Corporation shipyards
 
 Naval Station Bremerton
 Pacific Reserve Fleet, Bremerton
 Todd Shipyards – overview of shipyards operated by Todd

References 

 Todd Pacific Shipyards Incorporated Tacoma WA WWII construction record.
 Seattle-Tacoma Shipbuilding Corporation, from the Destroyer History website.
 Ships built at Todd Dry Dock, Seattle-Tacoma, and Todd Pacific at ShipbuildingHistory.com
 https://shipbuildinghistory.com/shipyards/large/toddseattle.htm
  

Defunct shipbuilding companies of the United States
Shipbuilding in Washington (state)
Defunct companies based in Tacoma, Washington
1946 disestablishments
Joint ventures
Shipyards building World War II warships